Rhombodera ornatipes is a species of praying mantises in the family Mantidae, found in the Philippines.

See also
List of mantis genera and species

References

o
Mantodea of Asia
Insects described in 1922